Save Our Heritage Organisation (SOHO) is a non-profit organization devoted to the preservation of the historic architecture and landmarks around the San Diego, California area. Founded in 1969, Save Our Heritage Organisation maintains several historic buildings including the Whaley House and the George W. Marston House. They are directly partnered with the National Trust for Historic Preservation.

The organization's mission statement is: "Through education, advocacy, and stewardship SOHO's mission is to preserve, promote and support preservation of the architectural, cultural and historical links and landmarks that contribute to the community identity, depth and character of our region."

History
 
The organization was founded in 1969 in San Diego, California by Robert Miles Parker. He and thirty-five other members the organization wrote its constitution in April of the founding year. The constitution states that, "The general purpose for which this corporation is formed is to purchase, own, move, improve, maintain, repair, display, lease and/or operate, as museums or otherwise, various homes, stores, buildings, and other structures exemplifying different types of architectural styles found in the San Diego area for the education and benefit of the public."

The first project the organization undertook was the restoration and relocation of the Sherman-Gilbert house, a Stick-Eastlake Victorian that was set to be demolished. The house was eventually relocated to the Old Town San Diego State Historic Park area.

In 1970, Save Our Heritage Organisation's Preservation Council was created. This council was instated to notify the organisation of any demolitions or sales of historic buildings going on in the San Diego area. Around the same time, Save Our Heritage Organisation worked with the Historical Site Board, the A.I.A (American Institution of Architects) and the San Diego Historical Society to purchase and restore the Villa Montezuma.

In 2009, Save Our Heritage Organisation celebrated its 40th anniversary. This milestone was marked by an award winning hour-long documentary titled Four Decades of Historic Preservation in San Diego County, by San Diego film maker and photographer Dan Soderberg. The film received a California Governor's Award for Historic Preservation. Also in 2009, they added the Marston House, a 1905 Arts & Crafts movement home, to their list of museums.

Projects
The Sherman-Gilbert House, a Stick-Eastlake Victorian house saved from demolition and relocated to Heritage Park in Old Town San Diego
Santa Fe Depot, a historic train depot saved from demolition
The Harfield Timberland Christian House, a Queen Anne Victorian house relocated to Heritage Park in Old Town San Diego
San Diego Rowing Club building, restored
Villa Montezuma, restored
The Burton House, a Classic Revival Victorian house relocated to Heritage Park in Old Town San Diego
The Bushyhead House, an Italianate Victorian house relocated to Heritage Park in Old Town San Diego
Granger Music Hall, restored
Horton Plaza, restored

Senlis Cottage, a 19th-century vernacular Victorian house relocated to Heritage Park in Old Town San Diego
Cliff House, helped by Save Our Heritage Organisation's Preservation Easement Program**
The Sherman-Judson residence, helped by Save Our Heritage Organisation's Preservation Easement Program**
The Wisteria Cottage, once John Cole's Bookstore, helped by Save Our Heritage Organisation's Preservation Easement Program**
The Senator Hotel, helped by Save Our Heritage Organisation's Preservation Easement Program**
The Callan Hotel, helped by Save Our Heritage Organisation's Preservation Easement Program**
The Brunswig Drug Company, helped by Save Our Heritage Organisation's Preservation Easement Program**
The Mission Brewery, helped by Save Our Heritage Organisation's Preservation Easement Program**
Greg Rogers House, a house in Chula Vista, California saved from demolition and restored
Percival Thompson House, restored
Green Dragon Colony, restored
Julia Liffreing House, restored
The Balboa Theatre, restored
Egyptian Revival Buildings, helped receive historic designation

Temple Beth Israel, saved from demolition, currently located in Heritage Park
Warner Ranch, saved from deterioration
San Diego Veterans war Building, saved
Canfield-Wright House, saved from demolition
Western Metal Supply Building, a building in Downtown San Diego saved by Save Our Heritage Organisation
Simon Levi Building, a building in Downtown San Diego saved by Save Our Heritage Organisation
Levi Wholesale Grocery Co., saved
Showley Bros Candy Company, a building in Downtown San Diego saved by Save Our Heritage Organisation
Schiefer & Sons Aeroplane Co., a building in Downtown San Diego saved by Save Our Heritage Organisation
Station A, a San Diego powerhouse saved by Save Our Heritage Organisation
Carnation Building, a building in Downtown San Diego saved by Save Our Heritage Organisation
Rosario Hall, a building in Downtown San Diego saved and relocated
Kidd & Krone Auto Parts Building, a building in Downtown San Diego saved by Save Our Heritage Organisation
TR Produce Building, a building in Downtown San Diego saved by Save Our Heritage Organisation
Art Deco Fire Station Building, a building in Downtown San Diego saved by Save Our Heritage Organisation
Bledsoe Company Furniture Warehouse, a building in Downtown San Diego saved by Save Our Heritage Organisation
Western Wholesale Drug Company Warehouse, a building in Downtown San Diego saved by Save Our Heritage Organisation
The Preservation Easement Program provides protection for historical sites façade

Museums and other buildings
Save Our Heritage Organisation maintains multiple museums and historic buildings including:

The Adobe Chapel, a chapel that served the first congregation in the state
The George and Anna Marston House Museum and Carriage House, an Arts & Crafts movement building built in 1905
The Warner-Carrillo Ranch House, California's first regular overland stage connection with St. Louis built in 1857.
The Santa Ysabel Store, an iconic landmark dating from 1884.

Other activities
The group, for purposes of public education, has frequently created or sponsored historic home tours, lectures, and workshops. SOHO operates gift/book stores in two locations. The organization assembles an annual Most Endangered List, a local take on the National Trust's Eleven Most Endangered List. The group publishes a quarterly magazine and has recently started a book publishing wing "Our Heritage Press". SOHO regularly acts as an adviser to smaller neighborhood advocacy groups.

References

External links
 Save Our Heritage Organisation Website
 National Trust for Historic Preservation - California Contacts
 San Diego Historical Society: Old Town San Diego State Historic Park - full list of sites and museums

History of San Diego
Non-profit organizations based in San Diego
Conservation and restoration organizations
Historical societies of the United States
Organizations established in 1969
1969 establishments in California